The 1973 SCCA Formula Super Vee season was the third season of the Sports Car Club of America sanctioned Formula Super Vee championship.

Race calendar and results

Final standings

References

SCCA Formula Super Vee